Mehmet Yıldız (born September 14, 1981 in Yozgat, Turkey) is a Turkish football player. He last played as a striker for Ankaragücü.

Career
Mehmet spent much time being loaned out from Sivasspor and also being sold a couple of times. Firstly was his loan spell at Çarşambaspor where he played only a handful of games. He then returned to Sivasspor to become a prominent member of the team. In 2003 Mehmet was sold to Antalyaspor where his career never hit the same heights as while at Sivasspor. The same happened again when he was sold to Türk Telekomspor the following season.

His performances lead Sivasspor to recall him to the first team where he has become club captain and a regular goal scorer for the Kırmızı-Beyaz with near a 1:1 ratio of goals per game.

Career statistics

References

External links
 
 
 
 

1981 births
Living people
Sportspeople from Yozgat
Turkish footballers
Süper Lig players
TFF First League players
Turkey international footballers
Sivasspor footballers
Antalyaspor footballers
Türk Telekom G.S.K. footballers
İstanbulspor footballers
Eskişehirspor footballers
Kardemir Karabükspor footballers
Ankaraspor footballers
MKE Ankaragücü footballers
Association football forwards